Birmingham is an unincorporated community located within Pemberton Township in Burlington County, New Jersey, United States. As of the 2010 United States Census, the ZIP Code Tabulation Area for ZIP Code 08011 had a population of 33. Though sparsely populated, it houses a post office and a Lanxess chemical facility.

Transportation
New Jersey Transit provides service to and from Philadelphia on the 317 route which can be accessed from County Route 530 which runs to the south of Birmingham.

Climate
The climate in this area is characterized by hot, humid summers and generally mild to cool winters.  According to the Köppen Climate Classification system, Birmingham has a humid subtropical climate, abbreviated "Cfa" on climate maps.

References

Pemberton Township, New Jersey
Unincorporated communities in Burlington County, New Jersey
Unincorporated communities in New Jersey